The Pathfinders were target-marking squadrons in RAF Bomber Command during World War II. They located and marked targets with flares, which a main bomber force could aim at, increasing the accuracy of their bombing. The Pathfinders were normally the first to receive new blind-bombing aids like Gee, Oboe and the H2S radar.

The early Pathfinder Force (PFF) squadrons was expanded to become a group, No. 8 (Pathfinder Force) Group in January 1943. The initial Pathfinder Force was five squadrons, while No. 8 Group ultimately grew to a strength of 19 squadrons. While the majority of Pathfinder squadrons and personnel were from the Royal Air Force, the group also included many from the air forces of other Commonwealth countries.

History

Background
At the start of the war in September 1939, RAF Bomber Command's doctrine was based on tight formations of heavily armed bombers attacking during daylight and fending off attacks by fighters with their defensive guns. In early missions over France and the Low Countries there was no clear outcome regarding the success of the bomber's guns: the Luftwaffe lacked widespread radar so their interception efforts were disorganized.

On 18 December 1939, a raid by three squadrons of Vickers Wellington targeting ships in the Heligoland Bight was detected on an experimental Freya radar long before it reached the target area. The British bomber force was met by German fighters that shot down 10 of the 22 bombers, with another two crashing in the sea and three more written-off on landing. The Luftwaffe lost only two fighters in return.

Although the causes for this disastrous outcome were heavily debated, it became clear that bomber forces could no longer defend themselves on their own. Bombing raids either needed to have fighter escort, which was difficult given the limited range of the fighters available at the time, or attacks had to be made at night when the enemy fighters could not see them.

In the era before the widespread use of radar and the techniques needed to guide fighters to their targets with radar, night bombing would render the bombers vulnerable only if they were picked up by searchlights, a relatively rare occurrence.

Offsetting the advantages of night bombing was the understanding that identifying the targets and attacking them accurately would be much more difficult. This meant a night bomber force was only useful against very large targets, like cities, and was one of the reasons daylight bombing was considered.

The Germans had also studied this problem and had invested considerable effort in radio navigation techniques to address this, demonstrating a standard of bombing accuracy during the night raids that daylight forces found difficult. The RAF lacked similar navigation systems, having ignored their development for a number of years, and relied almost entirely on dead reckoning and optical instruments such as the Course Setting Bomb Sight. In limited visibility conditions or when the target did not have a clearly distinguishing landmark, accurate bombing was very difficult.

Bomber Command pressed ahead with a night bombing campaign starting in 1940. Bomber crews reported good results, turning for home if they lost their way or could not find the target due to weather, and pressing on only if they felt confident they could identify the target with certainty. However, it was not long before reports started reaching the UK from observers on the ground reporting that the bombers were never even heard over the targets, let alone dropping their bombs nearby. At first these reports were dismissed, but as other branches of the UK armed forces complained, a report was commissioned to answer the question.

The result was the Butt Report of 18 August 1941, which noted that by the time the aircraft reached the Ruhr, only one in 10 ever flew within five miles of its target. Half of all the bombs carried into combat and dropped—many returned undropped—fell in open country. Only 1% of all the bombs were even in the vicinity of the target. Clearly something had to be done to address this or, as the other forces suggested, the strategic campaign should simply be dropped.

Around this time Frederick Lindemann wrote an infamous report on dehousing, suggesting that the bomber force be directed against German urban areas, destroying as many houses as possible and thus rendering the German workforce unable to work effectively. Accepting the recommendations of Lindemann's report after intense debate, the British began planning a major offensive starting in the spring of 1942 with the express aim of destroying German cities.

Also, by 1940 the British had started development of a number of night navigation aids, and were already testing the Gee hyperbolic navigation system on combat missions. These would be available in quantity in early 1942, just as the first of the new heavy bombers, the Avro Lancaster and Handley Page Halifax, would be arriving in quantity. These technological developments dovetailed with the policy changes influenced by Lindemann's report.

Formation
Faced with the same navigation problems as the RAF, the Luftwaffe had developed radio aids that were widely used during their bombing campaign, the Blitz of 1940/41. Lacking enough equipment to install in all their aircraft, a single experimental group, Kampfgruppe 100, was given all available receivers and trained extensively on their use. KGr 100 would fly over their target using these systems and drop flares, which the following aircraft would then aim their bombs at. On rare occasions KGr 100 was used as a pure bombing force, demonstrating the ability to drop bombs within 150 yards of their targets in any weather. The KGr 100 unit itself would, in mid-December 1941, be redesignated I.Gruppe/Kampfgeschwader 100, as the basis for a new Luftwaffe bomber wing, or Kampfgeschwader (literally "battle formation") that bore the same unit number.

The British, who had developed similar navigation aids, faced the same problem of quantity. Bomber Command expected to have only 300 Gee sets available by January 1942, all of them hand-built examples. Mass-produced models were not expected until May.

As it turned out, both predictions proved optimistic. An obvious solution to the Bomber Command's problems would be to simply copy the German technique of placing all available sets in a lead force. This was first proposed by Group Captain S. O. Bufton. Bomber Command's commander-in-chief Arthur "Bomber" Harris argued against the idea, with the backing of the majority of his Group commanders. His view was that an elite group would breed rivalry and envy, and have an adverse effect on morale. Adding fuel to his argument was his own personal dislike for Bufton. His own idea for improving accuracy was to hold competitions within groups to deliver improved bombing. In rebuttal, Sir Henry Tizard, adviser and one of the chief scientists supporting the war effort, responded "I do not think the formation of a first XV at rugby union makes little boys play any less enthusiastically."

Studying the German results, notably reports by R. V. Jones, the Air Ministry decided that the technique was sound, and they overrode Harris' objections and forced the matter. Harris responded by suggesting the pathfinders be distributed among the squadrons, but again his objections were overruled, as this would not produce the desired result of having the targets clearly marked in advance of the arrival of the main force. A specialist force was formed in August 1942 by transferring existing squadrons from the Bomber Command groups to make up the "Path Finder Force" (PFF).

The PFF began with five squadrons; one from each of the operational Bomber Command Groups: No. 1 Group contributed No. 156 Squadron RAF (equipped with the Wellington medium bomber), No. 2 Group No. 109 Squadron RAF—then "special duties"—(Wellingtons and Mosquitoes), No. 3 Group No. 7 Squadron RAF (Short Stirling heavy bombers), No. 4 Group No. 35 Squadron RAF (Halifax) and No. 5 Group No. 83 Squadron RAF (Lancaster). The PFF was commanded by an Australian officer, Air Vice-Marshal Don Bennett. Bennett was to be the youngest officer promoted to RAF Air Vice Marshal, at the age of 33, in 1943. However, Bennett was not the first choice—Harris opposed the first choice of the Air Ministry, Basil Embry, the leader of 2 Group.

The squadrons were located on adjacent airfields within No. 3 Group at Oakington, Graveley, Wyton and Warboys with a headquarters at RAF Wyton. No. 3 Group was responsible for the Force administratively though it was under the direct command of Harris.

Early action
The PFF was first put into action on the night of 18/19 August 1942, when 118 Bomber Command aircraft attacked Flensburg. PFF bombers were the first 31 aircraft of the raid, including Stirlings, Halifaxes, Lancasters and Wellingtons – from No. 7, 35, 83 and 156 squadrons. Flensburg, on an inlet of the Baltic, was in theory an easy target for the PFF on their first operation, but the winds shifted and the bomber force drifted north of the target to a part of Denmark whose coast also had many inlets. 16 PFF crews claimed to have marked the target area and 78 Main Force crews claimed to have bombed it. Reports from Flensburg stated that the town had not been hit at all, but a Danish report showed that the towns of Sønderborg and Abenra and a large area of Denmark up to 25 miles north of Flensburg were hit by scattered bombing. 26 houses were destroyed and 660 were damaged but only four Danish people were injured. The raid was a dismal failure, much to the delight of both Harris and other detractors of the strategic force as a whole.

The PFF's second mission was against Frankfurt on the night of 24/25 August. The group once again had great difficulty identifying its target in cloudy conditions, and most of the bombs fell in open country north and west of Frankfurt. Local reports stated that some bombs fell in the city, with 17 large and 53 small fires and with moderate property damage. Five people were killed including two anti-aircraft gunners, and 95 people were injured. The outlying villages of Schwalbach and Eschborn were heavily bombed. Six Lancasters, five Wellingtons, four Stirlings and one Halifax were lost, 7.1% of the force. Five Pathfinder aircraft, including that of the commanding officer of 7 Squadron, were among the losses.

The PFF finally proved itself on the night of 27/28 August 1942 against Kassel. There was little cloud over the city, and the Pathfinders were able to illuminate the area well. Widespread damage was caused, particularly in the south-western parts of the city. Kassel reported that 144 buildings were destroyed and 317 seriously damaged. Several military establishments were hit and 28 soldiers were killed, more than the civilian toll of 15, with 187 civilians and 64 soldiers injured. Among the buildings severely damaged were all three of the factories of the Henschel aircraft company. Of the 306 aircraft attacking the target, 31 were lost, 10.1% of the force.

The next night the PFF operated against Nuremberg as part of a force of 159 aircraft. Crews were ordered to attack Nuremberg at low altitude, and the PFF used new target illuminators adapted from 250 lb bomb casings. Photographs showed that these were placed with great accuracy and the crews of the Main Force claimed to have carried out a good attack. However, a report from Nuremberg stated that some bombs were dropped as far away as the town of Erlangen, nearly 10 miles to the north, and four people were killed there. In Nuremberg itself, the number of bombs recorded would indicate that approximately 50 aircraft hit the town. 137 people were killed; 126 civilians and 11 foreigners. 23 bombers were shot down, 14.5% of the force. Most of these were Wellingtons, which lost 34% of their number.

On 1/2 September 1942 the PFF illuminated Saarbrücken as part of a 231 aircraft force, but post-raid analysis showed this to be Saarlouis, 13 miles to the north and situated on a similar bend in the river. The next night a force of 200 bombers were led by accurate marking in Karlsruhe, and the raid was considered a great success, with an estimated 200 fires seen burning. Reconnaissance photographs showed much residential and some industrial damage. A very short report from Karlsruhe says only that 73 people were killed and that three public buildings in the city centre were hit.

Improved technique
As the PFF gained experience, new problems appeared. Many bombers in the Main Force lost their way to the target and either bombed randomly or turned for home. Another problem was that the illuminators would go out before the raid was complete, leaving the following aircraft to bomb on visible fires, if there were any. This led to the problem of "creepback", when the newly arriving bombers would drop their bombs on the near side of the fire so they could turn for home earlier. This led to subsequent bombs slowly walking backward along the attack vector, away from the target.

To address these problems the PFF adopted new techniques. Their force was split into three groups for each raid. The "illuminators" would drop white target illuminators at points along the attack vector, allowing aircraft to follow these markers over long distances and thus avoid getting lost en route. The "visual markers" would drop coloured target indicators on the target, but only if they were sure it had been identified. Finally the "backers-up" or "fire starters" used the visual markers' flares as the aim point for their own incendiary bombs to light fires in the proper location, which would burn longer than the flares.

The new technique was first employed on 4/5 September 1942 on a raid of 251 aircraft against Bremen. The weather was clear and the PFF marked the target correctly, with the majority of the following Main Force finding the target and bombing it. The post-raid analysis showed that 460 houses had been destroyed, 1,361 seriously damaged, and 7,592 lightly damaged. Added to this list were hundreds of light and medium industrial buildings, including the Weser aircraft works and the Atlas shipyard and associated warehouses. The raid was a complete success.

Another improvement was the introduction of larger bomb casings for the target indicators, starting with the "Pink Pansy" in an adapted 4,000 lb casing. Using these for the first time on the night of 10/11 September 479 aircraft attacked Düsseldorf and caused enormous damage. In addition to thousands of houses destroyed or heavily damaged, 39 industrial firms in Düsseldorf and 13 in Neuss were damaged so much that all production ceased, and 19,427 people were "bombed out".

German counterefforts
The Germans were well aware of the RAF's target marking, and quickly deduced the basic strategy was a copy of their own from 1940/41. German intelligence reports from later in the war show a wealth of information on the PFF. On the night of 15/16 October 1942 on a raid by 289 aircraft against Cologne, the Germans lit a decoy target indicator that deceived the majority of the Main Force's bombs. Only one 4,000 lb, three smaller General Purpose, and 210 incendiary bombs hit the city, of a force of almost 70,000 bombs in total.

Follow-up efforts during October and November were mostly small raids, including a number against cities in Italy. Weather and operational problems meant that raids during this period were limited and of greatly varied results.

New systems, increasing tempo
On 20/21 December 1942, H. E. Bufton personally led a force of six de Havilland Mosquitos on a raid against a power station at Lutterade, a small town in the Netherlands. Led entirely by the new Oboe navigation system, several bombs fell within 2 km of the target. The test was considered a success. A follow-up under more realistic conditions was carried out on the night of 31 December 1942/1 January 1943 against Düsseldorf, with two Mosquitos leading a force of eight Lancasters. Only one of the Oboes worked, but that was enough for the following heavies to bomb on and hit a number of industrial buildings. Another mission by three Mosquitos attacked the German night-fighter control room at Florennes airfield in Belgium, but there was complete cloud cover and the results were not known. It was clear by this point, after less than six months, that the PFF concept was a great advance.

Picked crews from the bomber groups were allowed to transfer and the PFF soon expanded into a completely new Group—designated No. 8 Group (PFF)—in January 1943. In April 1943 the group's strength was increased by two squadrons, with No. 405 (RCAF) Squadron, flying Halifaxes and No. 97 Squadron, flying Lancasters. In June the Pathfinders gained two more squadrons—Nos. 105 and 139 Squadrons—both of which were flying Mosquitos from RAF Marham. Later in the month Pathfinder HQ moved from RAF Wyton to Castle Hill House in Huntingdon. When new aircraft, such as the de Havilland Mosquito became available, the PFF got the first examples, and then equipped them with ever more sophisticated electronic equipment, such as Oboe, the radio navigation and bombing aid.

By January the pace of Bomber Command missions had dramatically increased, with major raids being carried out almost every night. On 11/12 February 1943 against Wilhelmshaven, the PFF used their H2S radar for the first time, dropping parachute flares above the heavy cloud cover in a technique known as "sky marking". The follow-up force observed an incredible event, a huge explosion seen through the complete cloud cover that lingered for 10 minutes. It was later learned this was the explosion of the naval ammunition depot at Mariensiel, which destroyed . Mission size continued to grow throughout, and although many missions continued to mark the wrong targets or fail for other reasons, the damage being caused continued to increase. On one particularly successful raid against Essen on 5/6 March 1943, 160 acres of land were destroyed with 53 separate buildings within the Krupp factories hit by bombs.

Master bomber
On the night of 20/21 June 1943 another change in technique was tested by 60 Lancasters (mostly from 5 Group) against Zeppelin works at Friedrichshafen which were believed to be making radar. In this raid one of the Lancasters was equipped with new high-frequency radio equipment that allowed them to communicate with the other bombers in the attack force. The follow-up force consisted of several groups, including PFF aircraft, who marked the target based on radio instructions from what would become known as "the Master Bomber". Another group of aircraft were to attempt a new technique, bombing at a specific time after passing a ground feature, in this case the shores of Lake Constance. Nearly 10% of the bombs hit the factory in what was considered a great success.

A combination of these techniques was first used on a large raid to great success on the night of 17/18 August 1943 in Operation Hydra against German rocket research at Peenemünde. 596 aircraft were led by a Master Bomber to a series of target indicators dropped at several different locations around the target area. By dropping different colours of indicators and calling aircraft to attack each one in turn, the entire area was heavily bombed. The aircraft from No.5 Group used their time-from-landmark technique again. The estimate has appeared in many sources that this raid set back the V-2 experimental programme by at least two months and reduced the scale of the eventual rocket attack. The V-2 team had to hastily move their testing facilities elsewhere. The Master Bomber became a common feature of large-scale raids from this time onwards.

The United States Army Air Forces operated a similar force within the Eighth Air Force for "blind-bombing" through overcast on daylight missions using H2X radar-equipped bombers, for which it also used the terms "Pathfinder", "PFF", and "master bomber".

Rivalry in Bomber Command 
Although the AOCs of the Groups had been mixed in their enthusiasm for the Pathfinder Force, they generally supported it. AVM Roderic Carr (4 Group) was opposed to its creation but had identified Bennett (10 Squadron was in his group) as the sort of person suitable for the job and passed over a squadron of Halifax heavy bombers. AVM Coryton had been a greater opponent but supplied a squadron of the new Avro Lancasters. There was rivalry between 8 Group and 5 Group,  driven by the rivalry between Bennett and the commander of 5 Group, Sir Ralph Cochrane. Through the CO of 617 Squadron Leonard Cheshire, Cochrane was an advocate of precision low-level marking and lobbied to be allowed to prove the theory and for 5 Group to attempt targets and techniques that 8 Group would not.

Cheshire marked targets using the fast Mosquito bomber, then later a Mustang fighter bomber. 617 Squadron achieved high levels of accuracy using the Stabilizing Automatic Bomb Sight; with the necessary accuracy of only  at the V weapon launch site at Abbeville. 5 Group also invented various techniques, such as the "5 Group corkscrew" to evade enemy fighters, and the "quick landing system".

Light Night Striking Force
The Light Night Striking Force (LNSF) was a development of the Pathfinder Force's use of the fast and long-ranged Mosquito bomber, which could carry a sizeable bomb load. Under 8 Group, the number of Mosquito squadrons was built up and used for harassing raids on Germany. To the two (Oboe-equipped) Mosquito squadrons already in the Pathfinder Force, 139 Squadron was added in June 1943, which Bennett intended to use for diversionary raids to draw the German night fighters away from the main force. In February 1944 a raid made entirely by Mosquitos was mounted against Düsseldorf. It was formed of the usual marker aircraft from 105 Squadron and 692 Squadron Mosquitos, each carrying a 4,000 lb "cookie" and backup aircraft with 500 lb delayed action bombs. With Harris' support, Bennett formed more Mosquito squadrons to expand the LNSF, giving him nine bomber squadrons, as well as the Oboe-equipped markers and 8 Group's meteorological Mosquitos. The LNSF achieved 27,239 sorties, their best month being March 1945 with nearly 3,000 sorties. The LNSF suffered the loss of just under 200 aircraft on operations or "damaged beyond repair". The Pathfinder Force flew a total of 50,490 sorties against some 3,440 targets and at least 3,727 members were killed on operations.

Tactics 
The proportion of Pathfinder aircraft to Main Force bombers could vary according to the difficulty and location of the target; 1 to 15 was common, though it could be as low as 1 to 3. By the start of 1944, the bulk of Bomber Command was bombing within 3 miles of the PFF indicators, an appreciable improvement in accuracy since 1942. The success or failure of a raid now largely depended on the Pathfinders' marker placement and the success of further correction marking.

Individual tasks
PFF crews found themselves given ever increasingly sophisticated and complex jobs that were constantly modified and developed tactically during the bombing campaign from 1943 until the end of the war. Some of the more usual tasks were as:

"Finders"; these were 8 Group aircraft tasked with dropping sticks of illuminating flares, firstly at critical points along the bombing route to aid navigation and keep the bomber stream compact and then across the approximate target area. If conditions were cloudy then these were dropped "blind" using H2S navigational radar.

"Illuminators"; were PFF aircraft flying in front of the main force who would drop markers or target indicators (TIs) onto the designated 'aiming point' already illuminated by the "Finders". Again, if conditions were cloudy H2S navigational radar was used. These TIs were designed to burn with various and varying colours to prevent the German defenses lighting decoy fires. Various TI's were dubbed "Pink Pansies", "Red Spots", and "Smoke Puffs". "Illuminators" could include Mosquitoes equipped with "Oboe" if the target was within the range of this bombing aid.

"Markers"; would then drop incendiaries onto the TIs just prior to the Main Force arrival. Further "Markers" called "Backers-Up" or "Supporters" would be distributed at points within the main bomber stream to remark or reinforce the original TIs as required.

As the war wore on, the role of "Master Bomber" was introduced. This was an idea that had been used by Guy Gibson in the Dam Busters raid. Bennett wanted to lead raids but was denied operational flying as Harris was not prepared to risk losing him. The appointed Pathfinder (usually an experienced senior officer) circled the target, broadcasting radio instructions to both Pathfinders and Main Force aircraft, correcting aiming points and generally co-ordinating the attack. In September  1944, Gibson himself died in a Mosquito after performing as "master bomber" for a raid on Germany.

Types of marking
Three types of target marking were developed by the Pathfinders. These were known by the codenames Parramatta, Wanganui and Newhaven – the names coming from locations in Australia, New Zealand and the UK which had links with Pathfinder staff. If the Oboe system was used to determine the release point then the word "Musical" was used as a prefix, e.g. "Musical Parramatta".

Parramatta
Parramatta used navigation aids such as H2S radar or Oboe radio signals to drop the markers.

Newhaven
Newhaven used illumination flares dropped above the target area to light it up sufficiently for a visual marking by the Pathfinder aircraft.

Wanganui
Wanganui was used when the target was obscured by cloud, industrial haze, or a smoke screen. Oboe or H2S was used to release the markers over the unseen target. The target indicators used were on parachutes to give an aiming point that could be seen by the main force. This was also known as "sky marking".

In all cases, further target Indicators would be dropped in the course of the raid to reinforce the marking and to compensate for earlier TIs either burning out or being extinguished by the bombing.

Equipment
For marking the Pathfinders used a number of special "Target Indicator" (TI) markers and bombs. These ejected coloured flares or illuminated the target.
 Candle Aircraft, TI, Bomb, Type H
the candle was the basic indicator. About 2 feet long and about 2 inches in diameter, it sequentially ejected flare pellets that burned for 15 seconds each. The type H was filled with alternately coloured pellets (red/yellow or red/green or yellow/green), and illuminated for about 5 1/2 minutes in total

Candles and other pyrotechnics were used as the fillings for the various Target Indicator bombs.
 No. 1 Mk 1 TI Bomb
 No. 7 Mk 1 Multi-flash Bomb
 No. 8 Mk 1 Spotfire Bomb

Squadrons and stations
Between 1942 and 1945
 No. 7 Squadron RAF - Stirling, then Lancaster
 No. 35 Squadron RAF - Halifax, then Lancaster
 No. 83 Squadron RAF - Lancaster
 No. 97 Squadron RAF - Lancaster
 No. 105 Squadron RAF - Mosquito
 No. 109 Squadron RAF - Wellington, then Mosquito - Oboe
 No. 128 Squadron RAF - Mosquito formed 1944
 No. 139 Squadron RAF - Mosquito
 No. 142 Squadron RAF - Mosquito formed 1944
 No. 156 Squadron RAF - Wellington, then Lancaster
 No. 162 Squadron RAF - Mosquito formed 1944
 No. 163 Squadron RAF - Mosquito formed 1945
 No. 405 Squadron RCAF - Halifax, then Lancaster
 No. 571 Squadron RAF - Mosquito formed 1944
 No. 582 Squadron RAF - Lancaster formed 1944
 No. 608 Squadron RAF - Mosquito formed 1944
 No. 627 Squadron RAF - Mosquito formed 1943
 No. 635 Squadron RAF - Lancaster formed 1944
 No. 692 Squadron RAF - Mosquito formed 1944

83, 97 and 627 Squadrons passed to 5 Group in April 1944

Stations
 RAF Bourn
 RAF Downham Market
 RAF Graveley
 RAF Gransden Lodge
 RAF Little Staughton
 RAF Marham
 RAF Oakington
 RAF Upwood
 RAF Warboys
 RAF Wyton

See also 
 List of Royal Air Force groups
 RAF Bomber Command Aircrew of World War II
 Pathfinder March, an annual 46-mile (74 kilometre) long-distance walk around the County of Cambridgeshire, England, to perpetuate the memory of No. 8 (Pathfinder Force) Group

Notes

References

Sources
 (Diary), "Campaign Diary, August 1942", Royal Air Force Bomber Command 60th Anniversary, RAF, 6 April 2005
 (Pathfinder), "No. 8 (Pathfinder Force) Group", RAF
 
 Maynard, John Bennett and the Pathfinders, Arms and Armour London, 1996, 
 Morris, Richard. Cheshire: The Biography of Leonard Cheshire, VC, OM. London: Viking Press, 2000.

Further reading 
 Bennett, D.C.T. Pathfinder. Goodall, 1988. .
 Stocker, Ted, DSO DFC. A Pathfinder's war. London: Grub Street, 2009. .

External links
 Pathfinder Story - Part I - a 1946 Flight article on the Pathfinders by the magazine's editor, Wing Commander Maurice A Smith, DFC.
 Pathfinder Story - Part II
 Pathfinder from the IBCC Digital Archive at the University of Lincoln.

Military units and formations in Huntingdonshire
Military units and formations of the Royal Air Force